Aftab Sultan (born 1954) is the former chairman of Pakistan's National Accountability Bureau. He succeeded retired NAB chairman Javed Iqbal on 21 July 2022.

Born in 1954, Sultan is a law graduate from Punjab University and has a postgraduate and master's degree from the University of Cambridge and the University of Edinburgh respectively. He joined the Police Service of Pakistan as Assistant Superintendent of Police in 1977 and was promoted to the office of Superintendent of Police in 1983. Also served as Inspector General of Police of Punjab Police Pakistan from April 2013 to May 2013. 

In 2010, during his tenure at the Intelligence Bureau (IB), he spearheaded a 5,000-page-long report on a case involving a multi-billion rupee Bank of Punjab loan scam. He became Director-General of the IB in June 2013 and served until April 2018.

References 

Living people
Chairmen of the National Accountability Bureau
1954 births
People from Faisalabad
University of the Punjab alumni